John Brewer (April 6, 1906 – May 2, 1980) was an American Professional Football Association player for the Dayton Triangles. He played collegiately at Georgia Tech.

See also 

 List of Georgia Tech Yellow Jackets starting quarterbacks

References

1906 births
1980 deaths
People from Taylor County, Georgia
Players of American football from Georgia (U.S. state)
American football quarterbacks
American football running backs
Georgia Tech Yellow Jackets football players
Dayton Triangles players